"Only If You Want It" is a song by Eazy-E. It is the only single released from 5150: Home 4 tha Sick. For "Only If You Want It" Eazy collaborated with rap group Naughty by Nature .

The B-side of the single was "Neighborhood Sniper", which featured Kokane and was produced and written by Eazy-E, Cold 187um. Both "Only If You Want It" and "Neighborhood Sniper" had promotional music videos released, but the single did not make it to any charts.

Single track listing

A-Side
"Only If You Want It" (Clean Mix)- 3:03  
"Only If You Want It" (Instrumental)- 3:03

B-Side
"Neighborhood Sniper" (Cold 187 um Street Uncensored Mix)- 5:12  
"Neighborhood Sniper" (Instrumental)- 5:12

External links

1992 singles
1992 songs
Eazy-E songs
Ruthless Records singles
Song recordings produced by Naughty by Nature
Songs written by Treach
Songs written by KayGee